Vriesea clausseniana is a plant species of flowering plant in the Bromeliaceae family. It is endemic to Brazil.

References

clausseniana
Flora of Brazil
Taxa named by John Gilbert Baker
Taxa named by Carl Christian Mez